Keating Summit (also Forest Home) is an unincorporated community in Keating Township, Potter County, Pennsylvania, United States.

Notes

Unincorporated communities in Potter County, Pennsylvania
Unincorporated communities in Pennsylvania